Jerome A. Davis (born February 27, 1962) is a former American football nose tackle who played one season with the Detroit Lions of the National Football League. He first enrolled at Illinois Valley Community College before transferring to Ball State University. He attended Hughes STEM High School in Cincinnati, Ohio.

References

External links
Just Sports Stats

Living people
1962 births
Players of American football from Cincinnati
American football defensive tackles
Illinois Valley Community College alumni
Ball State Cardinals football players
Detroit Lions players
National Football League replacement players